Miles Smith Farm is  a family-owned grass-fed beef farm located on Whitehouse Road (New Hampshire Route 106) in Loudon, New Hampshire, United States. Formerly a working family farm and stoneworks, its  have a panoramic view of the Merrimack Valley to the southwest.

Miles Smith Farm and neighboring grazing fields supports a herd of Scottish Highland and Angus that are chosen because they are a hardy breed and do well in rugged nature of central New Hampshire.  The farm also serves as an educational resource to local schools and clubs by practicing rural land use that is environmentally, economically and culturally sustainable.

Description

History
Miles Smith first farmed the area in 1830.  He  was  a stone  mason  by trade,  helping  the neighboring Shakers with their stonework and providing food from his dairy cattle, goats, and pigs. Smith knew the area well and farmed extensively, becoming the town of Loudon's hog reeve and field driver. Smith now resides in the cemetery on the farm along with other who have farmed the area over the years.

In 1918, Sarah Adeline Whitehouse buy the property. Whitehouse is a midwife who helped to bring over 45 children into the world and she was also known as the "best shot in Loudon" and filled the farmhouse with deer antlers.

In 2002, the current iteration of Miles Smith Farm is founded with just two pregnant Scottish Highland cows. In 2005, the first beef sales were made at a local cooperative market and a solar-powered store on the farm property opened in 2011.

Today, the farm has recovered over 200 acres of off-pasture farmland, including land belonging to St. Paul's School. St. Paul's strongly supports local agriculture and the local economy by making some of its unused land available to local farmers. The land is managed by the New Hampshire Audubon and also provides a natural habitat for grassland birds such as grasshopper sparrows and eastern meadowlarks.

Miles Smith Farm is participating in a program to extend the period of time when their cattle can graze from four to six months a year up to eight months a year by allowing the cattle to feed on turnips during the colder months.

Marketing and distribution

School program
In 2011, the farm started selling beef to the Gilford, New Hampshire School District, who were looking for fresh, locally grown, and healthier food to serve to the students and staff. The Concord School District, Oyster River Cooperative School District, and Seabrook, New Hampshire schools system followed in 2013.

Farmer's markets
Miles Smith Farm sells their beef directly to the consumer in various farmers' markets around the state, and have been featured by New Hampshire Magazine as a local food supplier. Their products are also available at many Hannaford Brothers Company grocery stores throughout New Hampshire.

Farm store
A retail store is located on the grounds of the farm and was outfitted with a solar energy system to heat and power the store. The solar array was part of a grant from the U.S. Department of Agriculture and funded by the department's Rural Energy for America Program to give a boost to farmers and businesses for projects that increase efficiency and decrease impacts.

USDA grant
In August 2014, the United States Department of Agriculture awarded the farm a $127,000 grant to produce and market local burgers made from a blend of grass-fed beef and pork. The grant was part of the 2008 Farm Bill given to nearly farms 250 in the United States to help farmers generate new products, create and expand marketing opportunities, and increase income.

Awards
 Carole Soule the co-owner of Miles Smith Farm was voted one of New Hampshire Magazine's Remarkable Women 2014

NH Hospital Meat program
Miles Smith Farm and the NH Hospital Meat Program provide locally raised, grass-fed beef to the patients, staff, and visitors of Franklin Regional Hospital and Lakes Region General Hospital. Through this partnership, patients, staff and visitors will be served healthier beef, free from hormones, antibiotics, artificial additives and preservatives.

Book
Carole Soule is also the author of the children's book, The Curious Little Calf Named Bleu, published in 2012.

See also 
 Highland cattle

Gallery

External links 
Miles Smith Farm
Guide to Buying Local NH Ingredients

References

Landmarks in New Hampshire
Farms in New Hampshire
Agriculture in New Hampshire
Companies based in Merrimack County, New Hampshire
Tourist attractions in Merrimack County, New Hampshire